In Greek mythology, Lelex (Ancient Greek: Λέλεξ, gen. Λέλεγος) was one of the original inhabitants of Laconia which was called after him, its first king, Lelegia.

Mythology 
Lelex was said to be autochthonous or his father was the sun-god Helios or the sea-god Poseidon. He was married to the Naiad nymph Cleocharia and became the father of several sons, including Eurotas, and possibly Myles and Polycaon. Some called his wife Peridia and their children were Myles, Polyclon, Bomolochus and Therapne.

In one tradition, again, Lelex was described as the son of Spartus, and father of Amyclas. The eponymous heroine Lakonia was credited to be a daughter of Lelex as well.

Through Myles, Lelex was the grandfather of Eurotas, who had a daughter named Sparta. This woman later marry Lacedaemon who named the city of Sparta after his wife; however, the city's name would also be his own, as it was called either Lacedaemon or Sparta interchangeably.

Sources indicate that Perseus was a descendant of Lelex. The latter's great-granddaughter Sparta gave birth to a daughter named Eurydice who had married Acrisius, the king of Argos. Eurydice became the mother of Danaë, thus making her Perseus’ grandmother.

Lelex appears to have been conceived by ancient mythographers as the eponymous founder of the Leleges, a semi-mythical people who lived on both sides of the Aegean Sea. He had a heroön at Sparta.

Notes

References 
 Beck, Hans, Localism and the Ancient Greek City-State, University of Chicago Press, 2020, . Google books.
 Apollodorus, The Library with an English Translation by Sir James George Frazer, F.B.A., F.R.S. in 2 Volumes, Cambridge, MA, Harvard University Press; London, William Heinemann Ltd. 1921. ISBN 0-674-99135-4. Online version at the Perseus Digital Library. Greek text available from the same website.
 Grimal, Pierre, The Dictionary of Classical Mythology, Wiley-Blackwell, 1996. 
 Pausanias, Description of Greece with an English Translation by W.H.S. Jones, Litt.D., and H.A. Ormerod, M.A., in 4 Volumes. Cambridge, MA, Harvard University Press; London, William Heinemann Ltd. 1918. . Online version at the Perseus Digital Library
 Pausanias, Graeciae Descriptio. 3 vols. Leipzig, Teubner. 1903.  Greek text available at the Perseus Digital Library.
 Stephanus of Byzantium, Stephani Byzantii Ethnicorum quae supersunt, edited by August Meineike (1790-1870), published 1849. A few entries from this important ancient handbook of place names have been translated by Brady Kiesling. Online version at the Topos Text Project.

Autochthons of classical mythology
Mythological kings of Laconia
Kings in Greek mythology
Children of Helios
Children of Poseidon
Demigods in classical mythology
Laconian characters in Greek mythology
Laconian mythology